Itogo-Ekingo is a town in Obi LGA of Benue State, Nigeria. The natives are mainly involved in localised farming.

Populated places in Benue State